Oulad Rahmoune is a small town and rural commune in El Jadida Province of the Casablanca-Settat region of Morocco. At the time of the 2004 census, the commune had a total population of 20,239 people living in 3414 households.

References

Populated places in El Jadida Province
Rural communes of Casablanca-Settat